Being: Liverpool is a 2012 fly on the wall documentary television series about Liverpool Football Club broadcast on Fox Soccer in the United States, Sportsnet in Canada, and Channel 5 in the United Kingdom. It follows the team behind the scenes on their pre season in North America in July 2012 and the buildup to their 2012–13 season in the Premier League.

The documentary was narrated by actor Clive Owen, who is a lifelong Liverpool fan.

Reception
Former Liverpool player Mark Lawrenson criticised the programme claiming that Anfield bosses of old would be "turning in their graves". The programme however was received well by a number of fans who believed it was a good way to give Liverpool some good press. The coverage of the Liverpool vs Roma game in Boston gave fans more of an insight into what went on when staff and players alike prepare on a pre-season tour.

Episodes

References

External links
 Being: Liverpool at Fox Soccer
 Being: Liverpool at Channel 5
 

2010s American documentary television series
2010s British reality television series
2012 American television series debuts
2012 American television series endings
2012 British television series debuts
2012 British television series endings
Channel 5 (British TV channel) reality television shows
Documentary films about association football
Fox Soccer original programming
Liverpool F.C.
Soccer on United States television
2010s British sports television series
Association football documentary television series